The Church of Jesus Christ of Latter-day Saints (LDS Church) (Spanish: La Iglesia de Jesucristo de los Santos de los Últimos Días) was established in Argentina in 1925 when Melvin J. Ballard arrived in Buenos Aires and opened the church's South American Mission. K.B. Reinhold Stoof became the first president of the South American Mission in July 1926. Missionary work largely focused on populations of German immigrants. After Stoof's release in 1935, the South American Mission split into the Brazilian Mission and the Argentine Mission. During World War II, missionaries were required to leave Argentina but then re-entered in 1947. The Argentine Mission divided again in 1962 and the first stake in Argentina was established in 1966 in Buenos Aires. The Buenos Aires Argentina Temple was dedicated on January 17, 1986, becoming the church's first temple in Argentina.

With 474,399 members at year-end 2021, Argentina ranks as having the 4th most members of the LDS Church in South America and 7th worldwide.  Membership grew by 22% between 2011 and 2021.

Beginnings

LDS Church president Heber J. Grant wanted to send missionaries to Argentina, so he sent Andrew Jenson on a trip to Argentina in 1923 in order to determine where missionaries may be successful. The church's general authorities wanted to be slow and cautious in their attempt to send missionaries into South America, because once the mission was established, they wanted it to stay. They didn't want to repeat what happened with the LDS Church in Japan, where the Japanese Mission had to be closed in 1924. In 1925, a group of German members of the LDS Church immigrated to Argentina.  Among these was Wilhelm Friedrichs and Emil Hoppe and their families who were escaping post-World War I Germany. In Argentina, Friedrichs and Hoppe published religious messages in newspapers. In 1924, they asked the First Presidency to send missionaries to the German immigrants in Argentina. Friedrichs wanted the First Presidency to send missionaries was because Friedrichs said it was difficult to meet people in their homes and Friedrichs did not have the Melchizedek Priesthood so he could not baptize anyone. Despite this, Friedrichs wrote in newspapers to explain Church teachings and invite people to meetings in his or Hoppe's home.

In fall 1925, the LDS Church announced that Melvin J. Ballard, an LDS apostle, along with Rulon S. Wells and Rey Pratt, would be traveling to Buenos Aires to establish missionary work in South America. Wells spoke fluent German and Pratt, who was currently serving as president of the Mexican Mission, was knowledgeable in Spanish and Latin culture. They arrived in Buenos Aires on December 6, 1925. The first baptisms in South America were Anna Kullick and Ernst Biebersdorf and their families, along with two other young women, all German immigrants. They were baptized on December 12, 1925 in the Rio de la Plata. Language was a challenge for the missionaries. Church talks needed to be translated from English to Spanish to German. Furthermore, the missionaries found it difficult to decide where to proselyte.

Establishment of the mission
The LDS Church was officially established on December 25, 1925, as the South American Mission. The mission was dedicated by Ballard in Tres de Febrero Park in Buenos Aires. For about 6 months, Ballard, Wells, and Pratt served as missionaries in Argentina. They presented lectures and slideshows about Ancient American ruins, Latter-day Saint history, or Salt Lake City. Having little success in Buenos Aires, they tried to teach in Liniers. Herta Klara Kullick, daughter of Anna and Jakob Kullick, quickly learned Spanish and brought over 100 of her friends to listen to the missionaries. In May 1926, the missionaries began to hold Sunday school for them. Baptisms followed in June. Pratt believed that missionary work should focus on Spanish speaking population.

In July 1926, K.B. Reinhold Stoof became president of the South American Mission. Ballard, Wells, and Pratt remained in Argentina for about a month after Stoof arrived. Initially, missionaries had little success. Even though Stoof did not speak Spanish, he brought a Spanish speaking missionary with him, J. Vernon Clark, to maintain missionary work with Spanish-speaking people. Stoof, however, "felt deep in his heart" that he needed to work with German immigrants.  Later, Stoof realized that the German immigrant populations in Argentina were too scattered and he focused missionaries on Spanish-speaking and Italian-speaking populations. During Stoof's nine-year presidency, branches were created in Buenos Aires and other cities, focusing on German immigrants. Stoof never mastered the Spanish language, and there was a tension between Stoof's desire to preach to Germans and the missionaries' desire to preach to Spanish-speakers. Stoof also wanted to carry on the wishes of Ballard to preach to the native populations, though Stoof struggled to do this successfully in Northern Argentina. Moreover, Stoof did not have enough missionaries to proselyte. During his presidency, there were only 50 missionaries to work in the South American Mission, split between Brazil and Argentina. There were 96 baptisms in from 1926 to 1931, 50 were German immigrants, 32 were Spanish-speaking, and 11 were Italian immigrants. By the end of 1928, only one family of those who were baptized were not immigrants. The mission was expanded in 1930, when missionaries were sent to Rosario.

In 1935, the South American Mission was divided into the Brazilian Mission and the Argentine Mission. There were 192 members of the LDS Church in Argentina by 1935. W. Ernest Young became the first president of the Argentine Mission, with stewardship for 14 missionaries and 255 church members. Young served from 1935 to 1938. Although there was a German-speaking branch in Buenos Aires, both missionary work and church meetings were in Spanish. Missionaries changed focus from German immigrants to Spanish speakers. In 1938, Frederick S. Williams became the president of the Argentine Mission. In 1938, there were 66 baptisms performed among the 45 missionaries. There were 438 members. Church meetings were held in 20 rented halls because the church did not yet own land in Argentina where they could build church buildings. The first LDS chapel built in Argentina was in Liniers in Buenos Aires. It was dedicated on April 9, 1939. This was also the first LDS chapel in South America. Branches were established in other cities, including Quilmes, La Plata, Rosario, Santa Fe, Bahía Blanca, Córdoba, and Mendoza. Williams used sports and musical events to give the LDS Church public and media attention. By 1940, the number of members of the LDS Church in Argentina had more than tripled from 1935 with church membership at nearly 600. From 1938 to 1941, the number of missionaries sent to Argentina doubled because World War II reduced the number of missionaries being sent to Europe. This caused Argentina to stop granted visas to missionaries. As a result, missionary work in Argentina slowed. In 1942, every missionary except for three was required to leave the country due to World War II. James Barker was the next president of the Argentine Mission, but he presided over a mission void of missionaries. Barker struggled to visit and maintain the administrative aspects of the LDS Church. Many branches closed.

Post World War II development
After World War II, Young again became president Argentina mission, though the mission still did not have missionaries. Young traveled to check on branches in Argentina. LDS Church membership increased from 597 in 1940 to 801 in 1945. Despite the lack of experienced missionaries and a mission housing shortage in 1947, 29 missionaries were sent to Argentina. Many of the missionaries were ex-servicemen from World War II and were "mature" and "disciplined". In 1949, LDS Church membership was 1,000 in 27 branches, yet missionaries provided most of the ecclesiastical leadership. That same year, Harold Brown became the new president of the Argentine Mission, fresh with experience with LDS Church leadership in Mexico. By 1950 church membership had increased by almost six times since 1935, with membership numbers larger than Brazil and Uruguay. During his presidency, Brown further developed local organization and recruited ecclesiastical leadership from church members in Argentina. Missionary work was expanded with the addition of new programs and proselyting areas. Brown was replaced by Lee Valentine, who continued to send missionaries into new areas in Argentina. Valentine guided LDS Church President David O. McKay on a tour of the Argentine Mission. There, McKay met with president of Argentina at the time Juan Perón. In 1956, Loren N. Pace replaced Valentine as mission president. By 1959, church membership had increased to 3,500. The North Argentine Mission was established in 1962. Even though the Book of Mormon had already been translated into Spanish, there was a lack of church materials in Spanish in South American countries. The church divided up the translation work among Spanish-speaking countries in South America. Argentina was responsible for translating Primary lessons for children into Spanish.

The first stake in Argentina was opened in 1966 in Buenos Aires. This was the first Spanish-speaking stake in South America and the second Spanish speaking stake in the world. Ángel Abrea was named as stake president. In 1981, Abrea become the first general authority from Latin America.

Argentina hosted area conferences in March 1975 and October 1978.  These conferences were attended by many general authorities, including church president Spencer W. Kimball. At the end of 1980, there were over 20 stakes, 5 missions, and nearly 50,000 members. In October 1985, a missionary training center (MTC) was built in Buenos Aires. The Buenos Aires Argentina Temple was dedicated on January 17, 1986, becoming the first temple in Argentina. In 1998, there were 265,000 members and 62 stakes in Argentina. By 2009, there were 70 stakes and 10 missions.

The MTC in Argentina will close in July 2019.

Cultural obstacles
There are two main obstacles to LDS missionary work in Argentina. First, traditions in Argentina are deeply rooted parts of their culture. These traditions discourage family members from converting to another religion because it requires someone to sacrifice their normal lives and traditions. Another obstacle to missionary work in Argentina is poverty. Poverty in Argentina is widespread and missionaries discover challenges in trying to proselyte to or convert families who lack food or basic human needs. Recent economic improvements in Argentina have improved the lives of Argentines and improved missionaries' abilities to perform missionary work.

Statistics and other information
As of October 2018, the LDS Church reported 452,309 members, 14 missions, 114 family history centers, 763 congregations with 488 wards and 275 branches, and 2 temples. Additionally, there were 76 stakes and 28 districts. Argentina ranks as having the 4th most members of the LDS Church in South America and 7th worldwide

Missions

Temples

References

External links
Official site (in Spanish)
The official Argentine website of The Church of Jesus Christ of Latter-day Saints
Argentina Mormon Newsroom (in Spanish)
LDS Church news publication in Argentina

 
1925 establishments in Argentina
Harold B. Lee Library-related Americana articles